LADE - Líneas Aéreas del Estado is an airline based in Comodoro Rivadavia, Argentina. It is a state owned airline operated by the Argentine Air Force and provides domestic scheduled services mainly in Patagonia.

History 
It was initially known as Líneas Aéreas Suroeste and consolidated under the present title in 1945 with another air force branch, Líneas Aéreas Noreste. By , DC-3s, DC-4s and Vikings made up LADE's fleet.

At March 1970, LADE had 150 employees and its fleet consisted of 14 DC-3s, two DC-4s, three DC-6s and six Twin Otters. The carrier started regular flights between Comodoro Rivadavia and the Falkland Islands in 1972. The Comodoro Rivadavia–Port Stanley run was initially operated with F.27 equipment. The limited length of the runway at Port Stanley Airport resulted in weight regulations to the aircraft operating the route, which restricted the number of carried passengers to a maximum of 22 per flight, along with a reduced volume of mail and freight. The service was discontinued in 1982, following the Falklands War.

At , the airline had a fleet of 11 F.27s —five -600s and six -400Ms—, five Fokker F.28-1000Cs and seven Twin Otters.
 LADE served a comprehensive domestic network that included scheduled services to Bahía Blanca, Buenos Aires, Comodoro Rivadavia, El Calafate, El Palomar, Gobernador Gregores, Lago Argentino, Mar del Plata, Miramar, Neuquén, Paraná, Puerto Madryn, Río Gallegos, Río Grande, San Antonio Oeste, San Carlos de Bariloche, San Martín de los Andes, Trelew, Ushuaia and Viedma. The fleet at this time consisted of Twin Otters, Fokker F27s, Fokker F28s and one Lockheed L-100-30 Hercules.

Destinations 

Its main base is General Enrique Mosconi International Airport, Comodoro Rivadavia with hubs in Aeroparque Jorge Newbery, Buenos Aires, with a hub at Comandante Armando Tola International Airport, El Calafate.

LADE - Líneas Aéreas del Estado operates services to the following domestic scheduled destinations (at June 2019):
Buenos Aires (Aeroparque Jorge Newbery) (hub)
Bahía Blanca (Comandante Espora Airport)
Bariloche (San Carlos de Bariloche Airport)
Chapelco (Aviador Carlos Campos Airport)
Comodoro Rivadavia (General Enrique Mosconi International Airport) (main hub)
El Calafate (Comandante Armando Tola International Airport) (hub)
Esquel (Esquel Airport)
Gobernador Gregores (Gobernador Gregores Airport)
Neuquen (Presidente Perón International Airport)
Perito Moreno (Perito Moreno Airport)
Puerto Madryn (El Tehuelche Airport)
Puerto San Julian (Capitán José Daniel Vazquez Airport)
Río Gallegos (Piloto Civil N. Fernández International Airport)
Río Grande (Hermes Quijada International Airport)
Rio Turbio (Río Turbio Airport)
Trelew (Almirante Marcos A. Zar Airport)
Ushuaia (Malvinas Argentinas International Airport)
Viedma (Gobernador Edgardo Castello Airport)

Fleet

The LADE - Líneas Aéreas del Estado fleet consists of the following aircraft (as of April 2021) 
4 Saab 340B
1 Fokker F-28
1 de Havilland Canada DHC-6 Twin Otter
1 Boeing 737-700
Those aircraft are for regular flights.

The air force cargo fleet is leased by LADE, consisting of:
2 Lockheed Martin C-130H Hercules
1 Lockheed Martin KC-130H Hercules

The two surviving Lockheed Martin C-130B Hercules were retired by the air force in September and December 2011 respectively, while the sole Lockheed Martin L-100-30 Hercules has been inoperative since early 2010.

There is a Presidential Fleet which is normally not assigned to LADE:

1 Boeing 757-200, callsign Tango 01
1 Fokker F28 Mk4000, callsign Tango 02
1 Fokker F28 Mk1000, callsign Tango 03

The rest of the fleet is inoperative:

2 Boeing 707-320B
7 De Havilland Canada DHC-6 Twin Otter Series 200
2 Fokker F28 Mk1000

As of June 2012, the LADE schedules show that nearly all flights are operated by Saab 340 aircraft, with the Fokker F28 fleet flying exclusively for the air force. Fokker F27s were withdrawn from the LADE schedules in April 2009, although they have since been known to sporadically operate LADE flights now and again.

Accidents and incidents

See also
 List of airlines of Argentina
 Transport in Argentina

References

External links

 

Airlines of Argentina
Airlines established in 1945
Argentine Air Force
Government-owned airlines
Military airlines
Companies based in Buenos Aires
Argentine companies established in 1945